Jebi Mather Hisham is member of Rajya Sabha and a leader of Indian National Congress from Kerala.

References

Indian National Congress politicians
Women members of the Rajya Sabha
Indian National Congress politicians from Kerala
Women in Kerala politics
Living people
Year of birth missing (living people)